Alexandre Maître, Marquis de Bay (1650 – 14 November 1715) was a French military officer in the service of Spain during the War of the Spanish Succession.

Born in Salins in 1650, Maître married Cécile de Winssinkercke, who had been born in Louvain on 7 September 1670. Maître was the seigneur of Laer, near Tirlemont. Between 1696 and 1701 he volunteered his service as a cavalry colonel with the Dutch Republic. In 1701 he offered his services to Philip V of Spain, and became general of cavalry serving in Flanders.  He distinguished himself in the War of Spanish Succession, especially during the Battle of Ekeren on 30 June 1703, fighting alongside the duc de Villeroy, at the head of the cavalry and the dragoons.

On 23 July 1704 Philip V granted Maître the dignity of Marquis de Bay and Captain-General of Extremadura. He was at this time described as lieutenant general of Philip's armies and first lieutenant of his bodyguards. On the night of 14–15 December 1706 he captured Alcántara with 800 infantry and 200 cavalry. In June 1707 he seized a fort defending the bridge at Olivenza, then demolished the bridge. On 4 October he stormed Ciudad Rodrigo, capturing the city after three-quarters of an hour. For this victory he was created a Knight of the Golden Fleece by the King of Spain, a title gazetted in France on 10 December 1707, and was named Viceroy of Extremadura. Maître led the Spanish armies at the 
Battle of La Gudina on 7 May 1709, defeating a combined Anglo-Portuguese force, and commanded at the Battle of Saragossa on 20 August 1710. He suffered a severe defeat at Saragossa, and in October 1712 was forced to withdraw after an attempt to storm Campo Maior failed in the face of strong Portuguese resistance.

Maître died at Badajoz on 14 November 1715.

References
 

1650 births
1715 deaths
French generals
Spanish generals
Spanish army commanders in the War of the Spanish Succession
Knights of the Golden Fleece of Spain
People from Jura (department)